Roseville is an unincorporated community in Jefferson County, in the U.S. state of Pennsylvania.

History
The community was named for one Mr. Rose, a local landowner.

References

Unincorporated communities in Jefferson County, Pennsylvania
Unincorporated communities in Pennsylvania